Milzkalne Station is a railway station on the Torņakalns – Tukums II Railway. Not every train stops at the Halt.

References

External links

Railway stations in Latvia
Railway stations opened in 1959